Heidi is a 2015 Swiss family film directed by Alain Gsponer and based on the 1881 novel of the same name by Johanna Spyri. It stars Anuk Steffen in the title role, alongside Bruno Ganz, Katharina Schüttler, Quirin Agrippi, Isabelle Ottmann and Anna Schinz.

Plot synopsis
After living for several years with her Aunt Dete (Anna Schinz), young orphan Heidi (Anuk Steffen) is brought to live in the Swiss Alps with her elderly grandfather, Alpöhi (Bruno Ganz). Despite being known as a fearsome recluse, he soon grows to love Heidi. She quickly befriends the goatherd, Peter (Quirin Agrippi), a boy slightly older than her. For the next few years, Heidi grows up happily with her grandfather, although she wishes to attend school in the village with the other local children.

One day, Aunt Dete unexpectedly returns and tricks Heidi into running away with her to Frankfurt (practically kidnapping her) to become a companion to a young girl from an upper-class family. The girl, Klara (Isabelle Ottmann), is unable to walk and uses a wheelchair; it is implied that she lost use of her legs after the death of her mother. Although her father loves her, he is often away on business and Klara is left with her strict governess, Fräulein Rottenmeier (Katharina Schüttler). Heidi struggles to read and fit into polite society, but she forms a close bond with Klara.

Klara's father returns and surprises Klara with a visit from her grandmother, who treats Heidi kindly and encourages her to learn how to read. Despite Heidi showing academic improvement, Klara's grandmother notices that the girl is unhappy in Frankfurt and informs her son. Klara's father initially ignores this as his daughter has been happy since Heidi's arrival. Soon, Heidi's homesickness manifests in sleepwalking around the house at night, scaring the house staff who had mistaken her for being a ghost. On the doctor's recommendation, Klara's father returns Heidi to her grandfather, upsetting Klara who feels that her only friend is abandoning her.

Heidi and Alpöhi joyfully reunite in the Alps. The two quickly settle back into life with each other and Alpöhi allows Heidi to attend school, purchasing a winter residence within the village. Meanwhile, Heidi frequently writes to Klara, who regrets her angry reaction to Heidi leaving. Soon, Klara's grandmother allows her to visit Heidi in the mountains. The two friends happily reunite, inciting the jealousy of Peter who pushes Klara's wheelchair off a cliff. He is scolded by Alpöhi and is immediately remorseful of his actions. While playing with Heidi and Peter on the mountains, Klara slowly regains the use of her legs. When her father and grandmother appear to take her home, Klara reveals her ability to walk again. Her father weeps with joy and is grateful to Heidi and Alpöhi for taking good care of his daughter.

Before Klara's grandmother leaves, she gifts Heidi with a notebook to encourage her dream of becoming a writer. Both families remain good friends and maintain contact with each other.

Cast
  as Heidi
 Bruno Ganz as Grandfather
 Quirin Agrippi as Peter, Heidi's goatherd mountain friend 
 Isabelle Ottmann as Klara Sesemann, Heidi's upper class town friend
 Katharina Schüttler as Fräulein Rottenmeier, Klara's governess
 Hannelore Hoger as Grandmother Sesemann
 Maxim Mehmet as Herr Sesemann, Klara's father
 Anna Schinz as Dete, Heidi's aunt
 Peter Lohmeyer as Sebastian, the kind butler at Klara's house
 Jella Haase as Tinette, a maid at Klara's house
 Rebecca Indermaur as Geissenpeterin
 Peter Jecklin as the village priest
 Monica Gubser as Peter's grandmother
 Markus Hering as the doctor

Production
The ten year old Steffen was chosen from among five hundred young actresses. The film was shot on location in the Alps, mainly in the region of Grisons, including Bergün and Rheinwald.

Release
The film debuted theatrically in Germany on 10 December 2015.

Reception
On review aggregator Rotten Tomatoes, the film holds an approval rating of 100% based on 7 reviews, with an average rating of 7.5/10.

References

External links
 
 
 

2015 films
Heidi films
2010s German-language films
Swiss German-language films
German children's films
Swiss children's films
Films set in the 1880s